is a Japanese manga series written and illustrated by Tatsuki Fujimoto. Its first arc was serialized in Shueisha's shōnen manga magazine Weekly Shōnen Jump from December 2018 to December 2020; its second arc began serialization in Shueisha's Shōnen Jump+ online magazine in July 2022. Its chapters have been collected in 13 tankōbon volumes as of January 2023.

Chainsaw Man follows the story of Denji, an impoverished young man who makes a contract that fuses his body with that of a dog-like devil named Pochita, granting him the ability to transform parts of his body into chainsaws. Denji eventually joins the Public Safety Devil Hunters, a government agency focused on fighting against devils whenever they become a threat to Japan. The second arc of the story focuses on Asa Mitaka, a high school student who enters into a contract with Yoru, the War Devil, who forces her to hunt down Chainsaw Man in order to reclaim the devils stolen from her.

In North America, the manga is licensed in English by Viz Media, for both print and digital release, and it is also published by Shueisha on the Manga Plus online platform. An anime television series adaptation produced by MAPPA was broadcast from October to December 2022.

By January 2023, the manga had over 23 million copies in circulation, making it one of the best-selling manga series. In 2021, it won the 66th Shogakukan Manga Award in the shōnen category and won the Harvey Awards in the Best Manga category in 2021 and 2022. Chainsaw Man has been overall well received by critics, who have commended its storytelling, characters, dark humor, and have particularly highlighted its violent scenes within the context of the story.

Synopsis

Setting
The story is set in a world where  are born from human fears. However, individuals called  specialize in hunting and employing them. The events take place in 1997, in an alternate timeline where the Soviet Union still exists, and many events such as the Holocaust, AIDS and nuclear weapons have been erased from history due to the consumption of their respective Devils by the Chainsaw Devil, with only four powerful Devils known as the Horsemen (Control, War, Famine/Hunger, and Death) remembering the events. Humans can make contracts with Devils via a sacrifice, allowing them to use the Devil's power. Devils can also become Fiends by possessing a human's dead body. When a Devil is killed on Earth, it reappears in Hell, and if it is killed in Hell, it reincarnates in a new body on Earth.

Plot

Part 1 – Public Safety Arc
Denji is a young man trapped in poverty, working off his deceased father's debt to the yakuza by working as a Devil Hunter, aided by Pochita, his canine companion and Chainsaw Devil. Denji is betrayed by the yakuza, who kill him for a contract with the Zombie Devil. Pochita makes a contract with Denji, merging with him as a human-devil Hybrid, under the condition that Denji live out his dreams of living a basic life such as having bread with jam, or falling in love with a woman and being intimate with one. By pulling on a cord in his chest, Denji then becomes Chainsaw Man and massacres the yakuza. In the aftermath, he joins a team of governmental Devil Hunters, the Public Safety Division, led by Makima, who assigns him to kill the Gun Devil. Denji fights through multiple enemies who seek Chainsaw Man's power, and trains with his partner, Power the Blood Fiend, under the veteran Devil Hunter Kishibe.

Makima later turns out to be the Control Devil, ultimately seeking to control Pochita, as he has the power to erase evil concepts from the world by consuming their Devils. Makima almost defeats the Gun Devil, until it retreats inside the dead body of Denji’s partner, Aki Hayakawa, forcing Denji to kill him in self-defense. Later, she kills Power in front of Denji, causing him to turn catatonic and turn his body over to Pochita. 

However, Kishibe organizes a raid to rescue Denji, and with his help as well as a frightened former teammate named Kobeni Higashiyama and a fragment of Power's blood, Denji kills Makima. Kishibe later reveals a reborn Control Devil, now a little girl named Nayuta. He asks Denji to look after her, and Pochita supports this mission in Denji's dreams. Denji begins attending high school while also fighting Devils as a vigilante.

Part 2 – School Arc
Asa Mitaka is an introverted high school student attending East High School, who has trouble finding her place in society following her mother's death to the Typhoon Devil. One day, after accidentally killing her class' pet Chicken Devil Bucky, she is confronted by the Class President who has made a contract with the Justice Devil. She attempts to kill Asa, but Yoru, the War Devil appears in the form of a bird and makes a contract with Asa, inhabiting her body and making her a living Fiend host, under the condition that she kills Chainsaw Man. After her quick vengeance, Asa seeks to find Chainsaw Man, though she and Yoru have differing goals: Asa wants Yoru to leave her body, while Yoru wants to reclaim the Nuclear Weapons Devil which was consumed by Pochita. They join the school's Devil Hunter Club, where they are partnered with Hirofumi Yoshida (a former coworker of Denji who is revealed to be attending Fourth East) and Yuko, an outgoing student who befriends her.

Meanwhile, Denji has adapted to his new life as a normal high school student, also attending Fourth East, while using his newfound superhero fame to attract women. Hirofumi keeps tabs on him under an unknown mission. Knowing that Denji is still desperate for a girlfriend, Hirofumi introduces Denji to Asa, who he attempts to reveal to her that he is Chainsaw Man, but fails.

Asa visits Yuko and later discovers that she also formed a contract with the Justice Devil and plans on enacting revenge on everyone who bullied Asa. Using Yoru's devil abilities, Asa confronts Yuko, but accidentally kills her. At that moment, a stranger walks up to her and revives Yuko for "her little sister", turning her into a giant devil rampaging through the school. Denji attacks Yuko, but she escapes. The now-disfigured Yuko bids farewell to Asa and goes on the run for help, but a mysterious impostor posing as Chainsaw Man kills her.

Following the incident, Asa and Yoru bump into and meet Haruka Iseumi, the President of both the Devil Hunter's Club and the Student Council, who has taken interest in her and the stranger. Haruka tells Asa and Yoru that he is Chainsaw Man, showing them the dangling cord attached to his chest as proof. Believing him, Asa is then made by Yoru to go find someone she can kill and turn into a weapon. Spotting Denji to be the perfect target, she then goes on a date with him in order to kill him and turn him into a weapon. During the date, while she is alone, the stranger suddenly appears behind her and the stranger then reveals herself to be the Hunger/Famine Devil or "Fami", who then isolates her, bringing Yoru and herself outside and seemingly assists her in her quest to turn Denji into a weapon as the two, along with Hirofumi and Haruka, are trapped by the returning Eternity Devil in an aquarium. During this time period, Asa learns that Haruka is not the impostor, and is instead a big fan of Chainsaw Man. Asa kills the Eternity Devil, and Yoru attempts to turn Denji into a weapon. To Asa and Yoru's surprise, this fails. 

Later, Denji takes Asa to his house, where he explains the rules of the house set by Nayuta, including not to make out with him. Yoru immediately possesses Asa and makes out with Denji, causing an arriving Nayuta to use her Control Devil powers on her. This leaves Denji shocked as Nayuta tells Denji that she turned Yoru into a pet as she does not like Asa's "scent", thinking Yoru is trying to take Denji away from her, only agreeing to turn her back if Denji lets her have ice-cream everyday and he does not have intimate moments with Asa. Nayuta tells Denji she is going to erase Asa's and Yoru's memories leading from the date up to Nayuta using her powers on her, which he agrees with. 

Later, outside the high school, Yoru tells Asa that Denji might not be into her saying they might've been stood up. Asa takes this as a positive, as she is thankful he "forgot" but she goes to add she desires human touch as she was confined with Denji for too long but negates her affection for Denji on hormones and that her time would be better used in solitude, studying. She is then approached by Hirofumi as he asks her if she could keep him company. Both talk in the Devil Hunter club room and Asa notes that Hirofumi is similar to her, seemingly hinting that he likes her, but instead, Hirofumi asks her to stay away from Denji. Nayuta notices that there is a scent of a particularly nasty Devil nearby, and encourages Denji to investigate as Chainsaw Man. As a depressed Asa is walking back home, a dead body falls in front of her, as multiple residents of her apartment building come outside.

Elsewhere, in a restaurant, Fami and Hirofumi discuss the mysterious "Prophecy of Nostradamus", which forewarns humanity's extinction on July 1999. Fami reveals that a Primal Fear devil (a devil that has existed since the beginning of time) has appeared 40 seconds ago. Meanwhile, Asa and Yoru are confronted by the Primal Fear, known as the Falling Devil, which Yoru runs away from claiming she cannot win the fight. It is revealed that on the day Asa's mother died, Asa saved a cat, and at the orphanage she and the cat were sent to, the caretaker tried to persuade Asa to give up the cat. When Asa refused, the caretaker threw the cat into the river out of spite.

Production
Despite the series' violence and dark humor, Tatsuki Fujimoto always wanted to serialize in Weekly Shōnen Jump, but he had the feeling that his work would be "buried" if he had made a "Jump-like manga", so he tried to retain much of his individuality as a creator while making only the structure and characters Jump-like. Fujimoto also said that, despite its success in the magazine, he wanted to write the second part of the series on Shōnen Jump+, because he wanted to do a completely different series from the first part. According to him, there is not much of a difference in working between Weekly Shōnen Jump and Shōnen Jump+, explaining that there were a few depictions that got stopped during the rough draft stage, but he was allowed to do anything he wanted regarding the logic of the story.

Fujimoto said that he took inspiration from various works. During the serialization of Chainsaw Man, Fujimoto said that he was too busy, but he watched as many new things as he could and borrowed various elements from what he saw. On Twitter, he stated that he was a fan of the 2016 film trilogy Kizumonogatari, and that the trilogy's final battle, shown in Part 3: Reiketsu, inspired the final battle of the first part of Chainsaw Man. He also described the series as a "wicked FLCL" and a "pop Abara." Fujimoto had various elements from the series planned from the beginning, while other things were added as it progressed. He did not have specific plans to bring payoff to the meaningful-sounding words and things that felt "off", adding that he left various things vague to make the series' second part easier to do.

Regarding the anime adaptation of the series, Fujimoto stated that he talked to the people handling it and he was comfortable leaving things to them. When the anime series was officially announced, Fujimoto commented: "Chainsaw Man is like a copycat of Dorohedoro and Jujutsu Kaisen, and the studio of Dorohedoro and Jujutsu Kaisen will produce its anime!? I have nothing to say! Please do it!" According to the manga's editor, Shihei Lin, Fujimoto is heavily involved in the production of the anime series, stating: "Fujimoto-san has seen all the Chainsaw Mans pitch documents, story structure, scripts, and even the storyboards. He has continued to be in close contact with MAPPA's anime team." MAPPA producer, Makoto Kimura, also commented that Fujimoto involvement extended to the casting, planning, and music, because the staff wanted the anime to capture as much of the manga's original vision as possible, including the violence and gore. MAPPA approached Shueisha with the pitch for the project.

Media

Manga

Chainsaw Man is written and illustrated by Tatsuki Fujimoto. The series' first part, ran in Shueisha's shōnen manga anthology Weekly Shōnen Jump from December 3, 2018, to December 14, 2020; following the series' conclusion in Weekly Shōnen Jump, a second part was announced to start on Shueisha's Shōnen Jump+ online magazine. On December 19, 2020, it was announced that the second part, would feature Denji going to school. The second part began serialization on July 13, 2022. Shueisha has collected its chapters into individual tankōbon volumes. The first volume was released on March 4, 2019. As of January 4, 2023, thirteen volumes have been released.

In North America, Viz Media published the series' first two chapters on their Weekly Shonen Jump digital magazine for its "Jump Start" initiative. The series was then published on the Shonen Jump digital platform after the cancellation of Weekly Shonen Jump. Shueisha also simulpublished the series in English on the app and website Manga Plus starting in January 2019. In February 2020, Viz Media announced the digital and print release of the manga. Viz Media posted an official trailer for the manga, featuring a high-octane opera vocals as its soundtrack. The first volume was released on October 6, 2020. As of June 7, 2022, eleven volumes have been released.

The manga is also licensed in France by Kazé, in Italy, Mexico and Brazil by Panini, in Spain by Norma Editorial, in Thailand by Siam Inter Comics, in Poland by Waneko, in Germany by Egmont Manga, in Argentina by Editorial Ivrea, in Taiwan by Tong Li Publishing, in South Korea by Haksan Publishing, in Russia by Azbooka-Atticus, and in Vietnam by Tre Publishing House.

Anime

On December 14, 2020, it was announced that the manga would receive an anime television series adaptation produced by MAPPA. It had a stage presentation at the Jump Festa '21, as part of the Jump Studio series of stage presentations that were held online on December 19–20, 2020. The first trailer for the anime series was shown at the "MAPPA Stage 2021 – 10th Anniversary" event, held on June 27, 2021. The anime is directed by Ryū Nakayama (director) and Masato Nakazono (chief episode director), with scripts by Hiroshi Seko, character designs by Kazutaka Sugiyama, and devil designs by Kiyotaka Oshiyama. Tatsuya Yoshihara is serving as action director and Yūsuke Takeda is directing the art. Naomi Nakano is the color key artist and Yohei Miyahara is designing the screens. The series was broadcast on TV Tokyo and other networks from October 12 to December 28, 2022.

Crunchyroll has licensed the series outside of Asia, and began streaming an English dub on October 25, 2022. Medialink licensed the series in Asia-Pacific.

Music
The music of the series is composed by Kensuke Ushio. The first soundtrack EP (for episodes 1–3), was released on October 26, 2022; the second EP (for episodes 4–7) was released on November 23; and the third EP (for episodes 8–12) was released on December 28. The original soundtrack album, Chainsaw Man Original Sound track Complete Edition - chainsaw edge fragments -, was released on January 23, 2023. The opening theme song is "Kick Back" by Kenshi Yonezu, while each episode features a different ending theme song.

Novel
A novel, titled , written by Sakaku Hishikawa, with illustrations by Tatsuki Fujimoto, was published on November 4, 2021. It tells three stories focused on a theme of "buddies" about Power and Denji, Kishibe and Quanxi during their partner era, and Himeno and Aki around the time they first met.

Viz Media licensed the novel and it is set to be released in Q3 2023.

Stage play
On December 29, 2022, it was announced that the series will receive a stage play adaptation, directed and written by Fumiya Matsuzaki, and will run in Tokyo and Kyoto from September to October 2023.

Other media
An exhibition, "Chainsaw Man Manga Exhibition", ran at the Space Hachikai gallery area of Tower Records, Shibuya, from June 12 to July 4, 2021.

Good Smile Company launched Nendoroid figures based on characters from the series in October 2021, including Denji, Pochita and Power. Denji made a cameo in the superhero manga series My Hero Academia in chapter 259, as part of the hero raid in the Paranormal War Liberation arc.

Reception

Popularity

Chainsaw Man ranked fourth on Takarajimasha's Kono Manga ga Sugoi! list of best manga of 2020 for male readers, and topped the 2021 list. On Freestyle magazine's The Best Manga 2020 Kono Manga wo Yome! list, the series ranked 12th, and 16th along with Demon Slayer: Kimetsu no Yaiba, on the 2021 list. It ranked second, behind Spy × Family, on "Nationwide Bookstore Employees' Recommended Comics of 2020" by the Honya Club online bookstore. In 2020, Chainsaw Man ranked tenth in the "Most Wanted Anime Adaptation" poll conducted by AnimeJapan. The series ranked 45th on the 2020 "Book of the Year" list by Da Vinci magazine; it ranked 43rd on the 2021 list. On TV Asahi's Manga Sōsenkyo 2021 poll, in which 150.000 people voted for their top 100 manga series, Chainsaw Man ranked 58th. The series was #12 on the annual Twitter Japan's Trend Awards in 2021, based on the social network's top trending topics of the year.

Manga

Sales
By August 2020, the manga had over 3 million copies in circulation; it had over 4.2 million copies in circulation by October 2020; over 5 million copies in circulation by December 2020; over 6.4 million copies in circulation by January 2021; over 9.3 million copies in circulation by March 2021; over 11 million copies in circulation by June 2021; over 12 million copies in circulation by December 2021; over 13 million copies in circulation by June 2022; over 15 million copies in circulation by August 2022; over 16 million copies in circulation by September 2022; over 18 million copies in circulation by October 2022; over 20 million copies in circulation by November 2022; and over 23 million copies in circulation by January 2023.

Chainsaw Man was the fifth best-selling manga series in the first half of 2021 (period between November 2020 and May 2021), with over 4 million copies sold. In 2021, it was the seventh best-selling manga with over 5 million copies sold.

In North America, the volumes of Chainsaw Man were ranked on NPD BookScan's monthly top 20 adult graphic novels list since 2020. They were also ranked on The New York Times Graphic Books and Manga bestseller monthly list since 2021. According to ICv2, Chainsaw Man was the tenth best-selling manga franchise for fall 2021 (September–December) in the United States, and it was also the third "most efficient manga franchise" for retailer bookshelves, based on the website's calculations of which manga franchises had the highest sales per volume. According to NPD BookScan, the first three volumes of Chainsaw Man were ranked among the top 20 highest-selling manga volumes in 2021; it was the best-selling manga series in 2022, with eight volumes featured on the top 20 highest-selling manga volumes. The first volume sold 18,000 copies in the United States in 2020, and the eight volumes collectively sold 623,000 copies in 2021.

Critical reception
Chainsaw Man has been overall well received by critics. James Beckett of Anime News Network ranked the first volume as a B+. Beckett commented: "[Chainsaw Man is] goofy, kinky, dark, and bizarre, which is already the kind of tonal mishmash I'm generally down for in my art," praising as well its compelling world-building and character development, adding that the volume "earns plenty of goodwill by committing to its surprisingly earnest and charming brand of ferocious bloodletting." Nicholas Dupree from the same website commented: "[i]t's a bizarre, unpredictable, and undeniably unique thrill ride, and love it or hate it, there's nothing else quite like it." Hannah Collins of Comic Book Resources gave the series a positive review, stating: "Chainsaw Man bears all the hallmarks of a standard supernatural action series, but its quieter moments are where its dark heart beats fastest." Polygons Julia Lee gave the series a positive review, commenting: "Chainsaw Man is considered one of Shonen Jumps best new series, and for good reason. The graphic rip-and-tear fights, paired with a unique and funny story about devils makes for one great manga." Sheena McNeil of Sequential Tart gave the first volume a 9/10. McNeil stated: "I did not think I was going to enjoy this manga. I'm glad I was wrong!" She noted that the series has similar elements from Army of Darkness, Devilman, Dorohedoro and inspiration from various devil-hunting series, recommending it to fans of those works.

Anna Neatrour of Manga Report gave a positive review to the first volume, calling its monster fighting, "buckets of gore", and humor "plenty amusing," and calling Denji an "incredibly damaged but potentially powerful hero." Reviewing the first volume, Danica Davidson of Otaku USA called the series "a little creepy" and "downright bizarre," adding however, that it is "a bloody, action-packed shonen with some heart showing through the weirdness, and it's been very successful in Japan." Following her "read-a-thoning" of the series, Katherine Dacey of The Manga Critic commented that she finished it with a "grudging respect for Fujimoto's excessive, ridiculous creation, which entertained and repelled me in equal measure. Your mileage will vary." Ian Wolf of Anime UK News gave the first volume a 6/10. Wolf wrote that the main feature of the series is the action sequences, but criticized the lack of depth in writing, concluding: "Chainsaw Man has some things going for it and hopefully may well build up from a promising start."

Fujimoto's art style has also been commended. Collins praised Fujimoto's penmanship, stating that the "thickly-sketched lines on individual characters and still moments convey the rough edges of [its] world." Dupree lauded the series' art style, stating: "as the Devil enemies of the story grow more powerful, his imagination for bizarre, abstract, and genuinely unsettling visual storytelling reaches heights I've never seen in a Jump series before." Beckett called the character designs and general linework "a bit generic at first glance," but that when "the carnage comes flooding in," the series "has a clarity of style and consistency of vision that can be wondrous to behold." McNeil said that the character designs, other than Pochita and Chainsaw Man, are "not memorable," but that the art "really shines for the creepy Devils, the action, and especially the gore." Regarding the devils' designs, Dacey wrote that some are "uninspired" and that the most memorable ones are "clearly designed to elicit an appreciative 'ewww. Wolf stated that the art of the series "feels better than its writing," adding that visually, the action and fighting make the manga appealing.

Themes
Various reviewers have commented the use of violence and gory scenes within the context of the story. Dupree wrote that the "irreverent tone and deliciously gory violence" are elements that make the series "really stand out from the get-go." Collins wrote that the gory scenes, instead of being gratuitous, make the story feel "refreshingly unfiltered." McNeil commented that the series is "wonderfully absurd. It's funny, and violent, but also has an interesting bit of humanity at its core." Davinson called it "casually gruesome and violent," but that it fits with its theme. Lee wrote: "Chainsaw Man is gory. Extremely gory," adding that these scenes make the series different from other shōnen series, calling them "pretty gross," but "fitting for a dark manga about slashing devils down with a chainsaw." Dacey called the series a "blood-and-testosterone-soaked battle manga," commenting that its main appeal is the "outrageous displays of gore and violence," adding as well that Fujimoto "does his utmost to push the boundaries of good taste." Beckett wrote that the "delightfully ridiculous and bloody" premise runs with it in "all sorts of fascinating directions," adding however, that its reveling in crude humor and violence could be off-putting to some readers.

Regarding the characters, Adi Tantimedh of Bleeding Cool called them "sad, broken people who live outside the norms of society and haven't learned basic social skills," adding as well that the series' subtext is about "people getting abused, degraded, dehumanized, objectified, literally becoming objects." He concluded: "[s]ociety is to blame for degrading people into tools and objects; these  seem to be saying, though they never outright blame Capitalism or the alienating repressiveness of Japanese society. The result is one of the more unique manga out there." Collins commented that the series has a premise "loosely" comparable to Jujutsu Kaisen, adding, however, that Denji might fit the mold of a shōnen protagonist on paper, but that the mold is "only there to be broken," comparing his "life on the fringes of society" to a "Dickensian parable about the plight of the working class." Dacey called Denji "a more honest shonen hero than the typical Jump lead; he thinks and acts like a real teenage boy, right down to his self-absorption and total objectification of women," adding that she could not say she "ever warmed to Denji as a lead character." Lee commented that the series has an "interestingly goofy contrast between the characters and what's going on," adding that Denji's simple mind and "kind-of-horny instincts" can get tiring at times, but it does not make the series bad, and with the introduction of the "extremely interesting side characters," like Power and Makima, the story "takes a turn for the better."

Its way of handling comedy has also been commented. Tantimedh stated that the series has a "unique sense of deadpan comic timing" that "makes the series unique," adding as well that the series distinguishes itself for its slapstick comedy and that a "deadly earnest" tone might have made the series unreadable. Beckett said that when he read the premise, he took the series at face value as a "goofy nonsense comic, a parody of shonen manga that primarily exists to push out page-after-page of gross-out gags and gory action," also calling it "a mishmash of raunchy teen sex comedies, Hellboy, and The Evil Dead." Dupree stated that the "crass, crude, and purposefully lowbrow" humor is one of its defining characteristics, adding that there are multiple jokes where it feels like half the punchline is that the series, "in all its gleefully nihilistic indulgence," was published in the same magazine as other "bleedingly sincere and family-friendly" titles like One Piece or My Hero Academia. Neatrour said: "[t]here's a level of off-kilter humor in Chainsaw Man that I find endearing," and that it also has "plenty of juvenile humor." Davinson commented that the humor of the series mainly revolves around Denji trying to get a girlfriend. Wolf wrote that "the ridiculousness of the story helps to add comedy to the whole thing," although, he called the humor "rather base at best."

Reviewers have also commented the emotional aspects of the series. Dacey discussed its unexpected moments of "genuine pathos," talking about the interactions between Denji and Pochita, noting as well parallels to Denji's relationship with Makima. Davidson also stated that the emotional part of the story is about the love between Denji and Pochita. Dupree wrote that the series' "bombastic, borderline nihilistic maelstrom of gore and dick jokes" is in part a reaction to the "absurd and illogical world it takes place in," adding that the series has a "proudly beating heart. Perhaps a cynical heart, but one that nonetheless sympathizes with the struggle to find meaning or solace in a cruel and unpredictable world." Reviewing the series' 97th and last chapter published in Weekly Shōnen Jump, Reiichi Narima of Real Sound commented that Denji's growth through loss is a storytelling more related to seinen manga than shōnen manga, adding that he was "deeply moved" by the inclusion of this kind of stories in the magazine, ultimately calling it a masterpiece and concluding: "at the core of bloody violence, there was a boy's sad love story."

Awards and nominations

Anime
On review aggregator Rotten Tomatoes, the first season of Chainsaw Man holds an approval rating of 97% based on 89 reviews, with an average rating of 8/10. The site's critics consensus reads, "Distinguished by its rip-roaring animation and serrated sense of humor, Chainsaw Man is an action anime with teeth." Mónica Marie Zorrilla of Inverse described Chainsaw Man as the standout of "demon-fighting anime" in 2022. She also praised Denji's contrast to other shōnen protagonists in his simpler motivations for "girls and food". Rafael Motamayor of IGN praised Chainsaw Mans cinematography, character dynamics and approach to its emotional moments. He also described it as a successful mix of "workplace comedy, horror, and action series", in contrast to most shōnen. IGN and Polygon praised the action scenes and its sudden tonal shifts from emotional scenes to "juvenile, 2000s sex comedy humor", while Polygon also praised its twelve different ending scenes.

Notes

References

Further reading

External links
  
  
  
 
 
 

 
2018 manga
2022 anime television series debuts
Action anime and manga
Alternate history manga
Anime series based on manga
Crunchyroll anime
Dark comedy anime and manga
Dark fantasy anime and manga
Demons in anime and manga
Fiction about shapeshifting
Harvey Award winners
MAPPA
Medialink
Shōnen manga
Shueisha manga
TV Tokyo original programming
Viz Media manga
Winners of the Shogakukan Manga Award for shōnen manga